Andrei Yevgenyevich Solovtsov (born 17 October 1967) is a former Russian professional footballer.

Club career
He made his professional debut in the Soviet First League in 1984 for FC Lokomotiv Moscow. He played 1 game in the UEFA Intertoto Cup 1998 for FC Shinnik Yaroslavl.

Honours
 Soviet Cup finalist: 1990.

References

1967 births
Footballers from Moscow
Living people
Soviet footballers
Russian footballers
Association football defenders
Soviet Union under-21 international footballers
FC Lokomotiv Moscow players
Russian Premier League players
FC Shinnik Yaroslavl players
FC Iskra Smolensk players